Imdad Hussain Chandio Son of  Late Raees Juryal Khan Chandio is a politician and agriculturist from Sindh, Pakistan.  Imdad Hussain Chandio popularly known as Imdad Khan Chandio is the leader of Cholyani-Chandio  tribe in Sindh. He has been a prominent leader of PML-N and held a diverse range of political and non-political appointments. In the year 1999, he was appointed as the Finance Minister of Sindh province; prior to that he was the Director of TVO (Trust for Voluntary Organisations), member Bait ul Maal-Pakistan; Chairman Khidmat Committee Larkana Division; Board member of Agriculture University Tando Jam and was the President of PML-N Sindh from 2001-2004 during the Musharraf era when the entire PML-N leadership was forced to be in exile; he led the party with utmost courage and resolve. Currently, he is the central Vice-President of Pakistan Muslim League (N).

Early life
Imdad Hussain Chandio was born in the village of Shamo Khan Chandio District Larkana, Sindh     Pakistan.
He completed his primary education from Taluka Warah and then went to pursue his secondary education from Taluka Mehar from where he passed with flying colours. He was an avid reader from his childhood and used to read literary books, poetry, novels, autobiographies and was especially attracted towards the subject of history.  However, due to early death of his father he was not able to pursue his education further and was compelled by the circumstances to go back to his hometown and lead his tribe along with taking care of his agricultural lands, fish farms and other businesses. Nevertheless, his devotion for academics and books made him read rich literature ranging from socialism to economics; this led him to become a polite, humble and upright man. He never compromised on principles and is regarded as one of the most upright politicians in Larkana.

Political activism
His passion for books made him become discontent with the feudal mindset and prevailing wadera culture at that time. Hence, he joined Tehrik e Istiqlaal as a young leader and was appointed as member of Central working committee. He followed the footsteps of his father by revolting against the local feudals who used to suppress and exploit the masses. He went against the local feudals and protested against the dictatorial regime of Zia ul Haq; therefore, he embarked on a courageous journey to purge his area from feudals and as well as continued his struggle to revive democracy in Pakistan during the dictatorial regime of Zia ul Haq when he led the like minded people in protests. During the course of which it was discovered that he had dynamic oratory and was a passionate speaker. He was a leading member in the movement to restore democracy (MRD). For which, he was imprisoned in jail for one year without being given any right of trial. Unflinched by his resolve to restore democracy, all the cases against him were dismissed and he was freed following which he became a prominent local political leader in Larkana. His passion to serve people made him contest for the election of chairman baldia warah where he got elected unopposed. He served the people with utmost devotion and was called upon by the chief of PML-N, Mian Nawaz Sharif to join his party. Following which he formally joined the PML-N and was made the divisional president of Larkana and member central working committee of PML- N. From then onwards, there was no going back and Imdad Hussain Chandio emerged as one of the most prominent politicians of Sindh.

Contribution
Imdad Hussain Chandio is regarded as one of the most respected and humble politicians of Sindh. It is because of his crystal clear past record and good reputation among the locals and politicians that he is said to earn nothing but respect. He is humble yet vociferous which could be judged by the fact that he stood like a might oak tree during the times of turmoil in the Musharraf era when every effort was made to lure him to join the PML-Q, but he refused categorically. His unwavering stance to stand by his parent political party (PML-N) strengthened democratic culture and showed the young party workers the way to pursue one's political commitments and ideology even in the face of grave threats and hardships. His speeches in various conferences, seminars, public rallies, demonstrations and television talk shows elicit that he is an epitome of a true leader who stands by his principles. He continues to stand by the democratic values of statesmanship, humbleness and uprightness. Mr. Imdad Hussain Chandio is considered to be persevering, steadfast and patient as he is considered as a pillar of MPL-N in Sindh, despite all the hardships he has faced in his political life be they: political cases, financial problems caused by the opposition, or tribal entanglements caused by a few notorious people.

His main contribution is to unite a very large number of Sindhi workers under the banner of his party and making PML(N) a popular mass party is Sindh. He is also called as Chief of Cholyani tribe. He also contributed a lot to resolve the tribal feuds among different tribes, and set the tradition of taking delegations to rival groups to convince and encourage them to resolve their bloody feuds through traditional dispute resolution mechanisms through the involvement of notables. Such community based dispute resolution is one of the main alternate to rival groups in the absence of rule of law and very corrupt judiciary and administration.
 Chandio

References 
 https://www.facebook.com/ImdadHussainCholianiPmln?ref=br_tf
 https://web.archive.org/web/20130715072154/http://www.pmln.com.pk/our_leadership.htm

Living people
Pakistan Muslim League (N) politicians
Baloch people
Sindhi people
Year of birth missing (living people)